Caccia all'uomo (translation: "Manhunt") is a 1961 Italian crime-drama film directed by Riccardo Freda and starring Eleonora Rossi Drago, Yvonne Furneaux and Umberto Orsini.

Plot  
Commissioner Nardelli is charged with capturing the dangerous bandit Mazzarò, who in Sicily killed a notary and kidnapped a girl. The key to the criminal organization is a young woman, Maria, who is the lover of a local baron and, at the same time, of the wanted bandit. Nardelli will succeed in the enterprise thanks to the police dog Dox. Once the mission is over, the two are transferred to Rome, where they solve the case of a model killed in the context of drug trafficking.

Cast 
 Eleonora Rossi Drago as Clara Ducci 
 Yvonne Furneaux as  Maria 
 Umberto Orsini as  Giovanni Maimonti 
 Riccardo Garrone as  Commissioner Nardelli 
 Andrea Checchi as  Inzirillo 
 Giorgia Moll as  Anna 
 Alberto Farnese as  Paolo 
 Philippe Leroy as  Mazzarò 
 Lila Rocco
 Fanfulla as  Luigi Visconti
 Vincenzo Musolino as  Pardino 
 Aldo Bufi Landi as  Baron  Platania 
 Franco Ressel as  Capo Cameriere 
 Nando Angelini
 Franco Balducci

References

External links

Italian crime drama films
Italian adventure films
Films directed by Riccardo Freda
1961 crime drama films
1961 films
Italian black-and-white films
1960s Italian films